Highway M05 is a state international highway in Ukraine connecting the two largest cities: Kyiv and Odesa.

Together with the M01 it is a part of European route E95 (Saint Petersburg – Kyiv – Odesa  Samsun – Merzifon) and the Trans-European transportation corridor IX. It starts in Kyiv, goes through Vasylkiv, Bila Tserkva, Uman, Liubashivka and ends in Odesa.

The road is a 2x2-lane dual carriageway in its entirety.

Main route

See also

 Roads in Ukraine
 Ukraine Highways
 International E-road network
 Pan-European corridors

References

External links
 Highways in Ukraine — Автодороги Украины.(russian lang.) Information about highways, motorways, regional roads in Ukraine.
 International Roads in Ukraine in Russian
 European Roads in Russian

Roads in Kyiv
Roads in Kyiv Oblast
Roads in Cherkasy Oblast
Roads in Kirovohrad Oblast
Roads in Mykolaiv Oblast
Roads in Odesa Oblast
European route E95